Emirati passports are passports given from the government of the United Arab Emirates (UAE) to Emirati citizens for the purpose of international travel.

History
Prior to the formation of the United Arab Emirates in 1971, each constituting emirate issued its own passports or travel documents. These documents were printed in both Arabic and English and often made a reference to the issuing emirate and its ruling sheikh.

Emirati passports issued since 11 December 2011 have been biometric passports. The UAE is the second GCC state (after Qatar) to issue such passports.

Types
There are a number of types of Emirati passports:

 Regular Passport (navy blue cover): issued to UAE citizens.
 Special Passport (green cover): issued to members of the Federal National Council, retired high-ranking government officials and their families. The passport can also be issued by a federal decision from the Supreme Federal Council to Emirati state representatives. This passport has the same visa regime as the diplomatic passport.
 Diplomatic Passport (red cover): issued to  members of the royal family and diplomats serving in Emirati embassies abroad and to high-ranking officials from the executive branch and their families during their period of service.
 Service or Temporary Passport (cyan cover): issued to citizens and non-citizens for a specific period of time to perform a service or a particular task of interest to the state. This passport if issued to non-citizens does not bestow a right of abode in the UAE.  
 Emergency Passport (grey cover): issued to citizens of the UAE who lost their passport abroad or lost their identity card in the GCC or their passport expired abroad or issued in times of a natural disaster or evacuation.

Physical appearance
The first and last pages are made of hard paper, thicker than that of the old passport—a measure that allows it to remain in good shape until the passport expires. The first page contains a watercolour outline of the outer frame of Sheikh Zayed Mosque and the last page contains a drawing of the actual mosque with domes and columns. The passport identity page has all the particulars printed and laminated. The new passports contain data to resolve name duplication, which is one of the biggest issues that existed with old passports.

Like passports of other states whose official language is written from right-to-left, the Emirati passport is similarly opened from the left-hand side. The cost of an Emirati passport is AED 50 (US$13.60).

Generic design
On the front cover of the each passport type, there is a representation of the emblem of the United Arab Emirates in the centre. The emblem was modified in 2008, and passports issued afterwards incorporated the new design.

Regular passports have  in Arabic calligraphy and "PASSPORT" in English below the coat of arms.

Special passports have  in Arabic calligraphy and "SPECIAL PASSPORT" in English below the coat of arms.

Diplomatic passports have  in Arabic calligraphy and "DIPLOMATIC PASSPORT" in English below the coat of arms.

A biometric passport has the biometric passport e-passport symbol  at the bottom. There are 62 pages in all biometric passport, and the last page contains encrypted biometric data to prevent forgery.

Identity Information page
The second page of an Emirati passport is security laminated and includes the following data:
 Photo of passport owner
 Type of document (P = passport)
 Code for issuing country (ARE = United Arab Emirates)
 Passport number (9 alphanumeric digits, chosen from numerals 0–9 and letters C, F, G, H, J, K, L, M, N, P, R, T, V, W, X, Y, Z. Thus, "0" denotes the numeral, not the letter "O".)
 Full Name 
 Date of birth 
 Sex 
 Nationality 
 Place of birth 
 Date of issue 
 Date of expiry 
 Authority that issued the passport 
 Owner's signature

The page ends with a 2-line machine readable zone, according to ICAO standard 9303. The country code is ARE as is the standard country code for United Arab Emirates (according to ISO 3166-1 alpha-3).

Languages
The data/information page is printed bilingually in both Arabic and English in all fields except for a white label in the next-to-last page in the passport which contains the United Arab Emirates Ministry of Interior emblem and documents the citizen's military specific claim number and uniform number.

Visa requirements

Visa requirements for Emirati citizens are administrative entry restrictions by the authorities of other states placed on citizens of the UAE. According to the Henley Passport Index, Emirati citizens had visa-free or visa on arrival access to 178 of countries and territories, ranking the Emirati passport 15th in the world in terms of travel freedom.

The Emirati passport is one of five passports with the greatest improvement in visa-free rating in the 2006–2016 time period.

The UAE Ministry of Foreign Affairs and International Cooperation plans to make the UAE passport one of the five strongest passports in the world by 2021. According to The Passport Index, this goal was achieved by December 2018, ranking the Emirati passport as the strongest passport in the world with a visa-free score of 170.

See also
 Visa requirements for United Arab Emirates citizens
 Visa policy of the United Arab Emirates
 Emirati nationality law

References

Passports by country
Government of the United Arab Emirates